Willem Ferdinand van Rheede van Oudtschoorn Bergh (2 November 1906 – 28 May 1973), better known as "Ferdie" Bergh, was a South African rugby union player.

Biography
He was originally from Stellenbosch, well known as a Springbok rugby breeding ground. He studied at Stellenbosch University, after which he went to Potchefstroom.

Willem Ferdinand van Rheede van Oudtschoorn Bergh may hold the record for having the longest name in international rugby, comprising 43 letters in total, including seven words and five names ("Van Rheede" and "Van Oudtschoorn" counting as single names.

He is most famous for scoring the winning try in the only test rugby series ever won by South Africa in New Zealand.

Test history

See also
List of South Africa national rugby union players – Springbok no. 228

Bibliography
 Cotton, Fran (Ed.) (1984) The Book of Rugby Disasters & Bizarre Records. (Compiled by Chris Rhys. London. Century Publishing. )

References

External links
 Player profile on scrum.com

South African rugby union players
South Africa international rugby union players
Afrikaner people
1973 deaths
1906 births
People from Stellenbosch
Rugby union locks
Rugby union number eights
Rugby union players from the Western Cape
Leopards (rugby union) players